Robson Chaves Santana (born 28 February 1988) better known as just Robinho, is a Brazilian professional footballer who plays as a midfielder for Olímpia FC on loan from Mumbai FC.

Career
Robinho was formed in the basic categories of São Paulo F.C. and further excel in EC Juventude in 2005, where he was the top scorer of the Copa FGF team , Robinho hit two-year contract with Palmeiras.

In January 2009, he moved to figueirense where he played for two seasons.

After a few seasons in international leagues, he joined on loan the Olímpia FC team.

Club career statistics

References

Living people
Brazilian footballers
Mumbai FC players
Association football midfielders
I-League players
Expatriate footballers in India
1988 births
Footballers from São Paulo